Bellator 292: Nurmagomedov vs. Henderson was a mixed martial arts event produced by Bellator MMA that took place on March 10, 2023, at the SAP Center in San Jose, California, United States.

Background 
To kick off the $1 million Bellator Lightweight World Grand Prix, a Bellator Lightweight World Championship bout between current champion Usman Nurmagomedov and Benson Henderson (former WEC and UFC Lightweight Champion) headlined the event. In the co-main event, Tofiq Musayev faced off against Alexandr Shabliy in a quarterfinal match. After the main event bout, Henderson announced his retirement from professional mixed martial arts.

A bantamweight bout between former title challenger Leandro Higo (also former LFA Bantamweight Champion) and James Gallagher was scheduled for this event. However, in Mid February, Gallagher pulled out of the bout due to undisclosed reasons and the bout was scrapped.

A women's flyweight bout between Keri Taylor-Melendez and Bruna Ellen was scheduled for this event. However, at the end of February, Taylor-Melendez pulled out of the bout and it was scrapped.

At the weigh-ins, Cass Bell weighed in at 145.2 pounds, 9.2 pounds over the non-title bantamweight fight limit. The bout proceeded at catchweight with Bell being fined 50% of his purse, which went to his opponent Josh Hill.

Results

Reported payout
The following is the reported payout to the fighters as reported to the California State Athletic Commission. It is important to note the amounts do not include sponsor money, discretionary bonuses, viewership points or additional earnings.

 Usman Nurmagomedov: $150,000 (no win bonus) def. Benson Henderson: $150,000
 Alexander Shabliy: $150,000 (includes $75,000 win bonus) def. Tofiq Musayev: $65,000
 Linton Vassell: $100,000 (no win bonus) def. Valentin Moldavsky: $75,000
 Michael Page: $100,000 (no win bonus) def. Goiti Yamauchi: $66,000
 Enrique Barzola: $62,000 (includes $31,000 win bonus) def. Érik Pérez: $20,000
 Josh Hill: $80,000 (includes $40,000 win bonus) def. Cass Bell: $13,000
 Khalid Murtazaliev: $40,000 (includes $20,000 win bonus) def. Tony Johnson: $10,000
 Dovletdzhan Yagshimuradov: $80,000 (includes $40,000 win bonus) def. Julius Anglickas: $50,000
 Laird Anderson: $8,000 (includes $4,000 win bonus) def. Rogelio Luna: $2,000
 Theo Haig: $6,000 (includes $3,000 win bonus) def. Adam Wamsley: $2,00

See also 

 2023 in Bellator MMA
 List of Bellator MMA events
 List of current Bellator fighters
 Bellator MMA Rankings

References 

Events in San Jose, California
Bellator MMA events
2023 in mixed martial arts
March 2023 sports events in the United States
2023 in sports in California
Mixed martial arts in California
Sports competitions in California